John Kuc is a former world champion powerlifter from the United States. During the 1970s and 80s, he set numerous powerlifting national and world records, won three International Powerlifting Federation (IPF) world championships and numerous national championships.

Although Jon Cole squatted 905 pounds and totaled 2370 pounds (later weighed out at 2364) a bit earlier in a AAU local meet in Phoenix, Arizona on October 28, 1972, Kuc became known as the first man to squat over 900 and total 2300 pounds in a major international competition with a more strict judging at the AAU World Powerlifting Championships on November 11, 1972 by squatting 905 pounds and totaling an impressive 2350 pounds (905-600-845) (raw with just ace bandages), which is still one of the highest raw totals ever achieved until today.

Personal Records

done in official Powerlifting full meets
 Squat - 905.0 lbs (410.5 kg) raw with ace-bandage knee wraps @ 322.25 lb. bodyweight
 Bench press - 600 lbs (272.2 kg) raw @ 322.25 lb. bodyweight
 Deadlift - 870.8 lbs (395.0 kg) raw @ 242.5 lb. bodyweight
 Total - 2350 lbs (905-600-845) / 1065.9 kg (410.5-272.2-383.3) raw with ace-bandage wraps @ 322.25 lb. bodyweight

Career aggregate total (best official lifts): 2375.8 lbs (905 + 600 + 870.8)

See also
 Jim Williams
 Jon Cole
 Don Reinhoudt

References

External links
 Starting Strength - Iron Icons Big Jim Williams and John Kuc by Marty Gallagher
 Starting Strength - Iron Icons Kuc & Williams, II by Marty Gallagher

1947 births
Living people
American strength athletes
American powerlifters